WIZR (930 AM) is a radio station that broadcasts a hot adult contemporary format. Licensed to Johnstown, New York, United States, the station serves the Mohawk Valley area.  The station is owned by the Cranesville Radio Network and features hit songs from the 1990s till today.

By day, WIZR transmits with 1,000 watts, but to avoid interference with other stations on 930 AM, at night it reduces power to only 28 watts.  Programming is also heard on two FM translators, at 102.9 MHz in Johnstown and on 104.3 MHz in Northville.

History
WIZR signed on in 1964, airing a middle of the road format.  Four years later, sister station WIZR-FM 104.9 (now WINU in Altamont, New York) signed on, simulcasting the AM station's programming. In 1973, the stations flipped to a top 40 simulcast; with the FM side flipping to oldies in 1980.

With the decline of top 40 formats on AM, WIZR switched to the syndicated "Music of Your Life" format under the call sign WMYL in 1981.  (The call letters stood for Music of Your Life.)  WIZR-FM signed off in 1982 and returned after a one-year absence, simulcasting the AM's adult standards format. In 1984, Joe Caruso acquired the stations, and reinstated the WIZR call sign on the AM side while the FM took on a new format and the WSRD call letters.

In early 1998, Joe Caruso sought to move FM 104.9 closer to the Albany market by securing a construction permit to relocate WSRD to Altamont, New York.  Later that year, Pamal Broadcasting acquired both stations for $2.2 million.  Upon the closure of the sale, former sister station WSRD moved to its new transmitter site and is now WINU, while WIZR began to carry ABC's now-defunct Timeless radio network.

In December 2008, WIZR went silent as Pamal Broadcasting prepared for a sale of the radio station.  Eventually, Dr. Thomas J. Kuettel purchased the station in early 2010.  He installed a classic country format under Dial Global's True Country satellite service on March 15, 2010. On June 1, 2011, the station changed to Dial Global's oldies network. In March 2013 WIZR changed FM translator frequencies to 102.9, also adopting a new slogan "Your Home For Classic Hits" as Dial Global had changed and updated the format.

In April 2014, the sale of WIZR began, with the Cranesville Radio Network of Amsterdam, NY purchasing. The station was flipped to an AC format, with a minor Hot AC change coming in July 2014. The license transfer for WIZR(AM) and W243CV(FM) Translator was consummated on October 31, 2014, at a price of $150,000.

WIZR becomes the 4th station in the Cranesville Amsterdam cluster, including WCSS AM 1490, WKAJ AM 1120, and WYVS 96.5 FM.

References

External links

IZR
Radio stations established in 1964
1964 establishments in New York (state)
Hot adult contemporary radio stations in the United States